James Roe Jr. (born 11 October 1998) is an Irish racing driver. He is set to compete in Indy NXT with Andretti Autosport in 2023. He previously drove for TJ Speed Motorsports in 2022. Roe previously competed in the Indy Pro 2000 Championship with Turn 3 Motorsport. Roe is a nephew of former racing driver Michael Roe.

Racing career

Indy Pro 2000 
On February 22, 2021, it was announced that Roe would be joining Turn 3 Motorsport to compete in the 2021 Indy Pro 2000 Championship.  Roe managed to get his first win of the season at the final race in Mid-Ohio, finishing ahead of Enaam Ahmed and 2021 series champion, Christian Rasmussen.

Indy NXT 
On January 11, 2022, TJ Speed Motorsports announced that it would field a second entry in the 2022 Indy Lights season for Roe.

On January 4, 2023, it was announced that Roe would compete full-time in the 2023 Indy NXT season for Andretti Autosport.

Racing record

Career summary 

*Season still in progress.

Motorsports career results 
Formula 4 UAE Championship

(key) (Races in bold indicate pole position) (Races in italics indicate fastest lap)

American open-wheel results

F2000 Championship Series

(key) (Races in bold indicate pole position) (Races in italics indicate fastest lap)

U.S. F2000 National Championship Series

(key) (Races in bold indicate pole position) (Races in italics indicate fastest lap)

Formula 3 Americas Championship

(key) (Races in bold indicate pole position) (Races in italics indicate fastest lap)

Formula Regional Americas Championship

(key) (Races in bold indicate pole position) (Races in italics indicate fastest lap)

Indy Pro 2000 Championship

(key) (Races in bold indicate pole position) (Races in italics indicate fastest lap) (Races with * indicate most race laps led)

Indy Lights / Indy NXT

(key) (Races in bold indicate pole position) (Races in italics indicate fastest lap) (Races with * indicate most race laps led)

References

External links 

 Official website
 James Roe Jr career summary at DriverDB.com

1998 births
Living people
Irish racing drivers
U.S. F2000 National Championship drivers
Indy Pro 2000 Championship drivers
Indy Lights drivers
Formula Regional Americas Championship drivers
Dale Coyne Racing drivers
International GT Open drivers
Andretti Autosport drivers
UAE F4 Championship drivers
HMD Motorsports drivers